Michael McIntyre's Big Show (also known as Michael McIntyre's Big Christmas Show) is a BAFTA award-winning British variety and stand-up comedy television series, presented by British comedian, presenter Michael McIntyre.

Series overview

Episodes

Christmas Special (2015)
Michael McIntyre's Big Christmas Show aired on 25 December 2015 on BBC One. This episode also served as a pilot for the upcoming series.

Series 1 (2016)
The BBC announced they had ordered a full series which aired from 16 April until 28 May 2016.

Series 2 (2016)
On 7 May 2016, the BBC announced that a second series of Michael McIntyre's Big Show had been commissioned.

This series aired for six episodes and was recorded in August, September and October 2016. The series began airing on BBC One on 19 November 2016. There was also a Christmas special entitled Michael Mcintyre's Big Christmas Show that aired on Christmas Eve.

Series 3 (2017)
On 23 November 2016, it was announced that the BBC had commissioned a third series of Michael McIntyre's Big Show. Six episodes were recorded in September and October 2017 and the series began airing from 18 November and ending with a Christmas Special entitled Michael McIntyre's Big Christmas Show on Christmas Eve.

Series 4 (2018–19)
It was announced in December 2017 that the series had been renewed for a fourth series, consisting of 8 episodes, to air in Autumn 2018. It premiered on BBC One on 17 November 2018. Viewing figures adapted from BARB. At the end of series 4, a recap special was aired wherein Michael looked back at his favourite surprises and pranks from the first four series of the Big Show.

Series 5 (2019)
At the end of the fourth series on Saturday 12 January 2019.  Michael announced at the end of the show, that a fifth series would be on later in 2019. Filming for series 5 took place at the new location of the London Palladium in September, October and November 2019.  The fifth series started on Saturday 23 November 2019 and ran for five weeks between 23 November and 21 December 2019. The series concluded with a Christmas Special on Christmas Day 2019.

Series 6 (2023)
After a three year break due to the COVID-19 pandemic, Michael McIntyre's Big Show returned to the screens in January 2023 for its 6th series.

References

Michael McIntyre